Eva Maria Louise Malmer Stenergard (born 23 March 1981) is a Swedish politician for the Moderate party. Since 18 October 2022 she is the Minister of Migration in the Ulf Kristersson cabinet. From 2014 until her appointment as minister in 2022, she was a member of the parliament.

References

1981 births
Living people
21st-century Swedish politicians
21st-century Swedish women politicians
Members of the Riksdag 2014–2018
Members of the Riksdag 2018–2022
Members of the Riksdag 2022–2026
Women members of the Riksdag
Members of the Riksdag from the Moderate Party
Swedish Ministers for Migration and Asylum Policy
Women government ministers of Sweden
Lund University alumni
People from Kristianstad Municipality